Millions of Dead Cops is the debut studio album by the American hardcore punk band MDC. It was originally self-released in February 1982, being reissued/remixed through their own label R Radical with help from Alternative Tentacles later that year. Today it is considered a hardcore punk classic. The album was re-released by Twisted Chords in June 1988 as Millions of Dead Cops/More Dead Cops with 13 bonus tracks including both tracks from the "John Wayne Was a Nazi" single, the Multi-Death Corporations EP, the Millions of Dead Children EP and four previously-unreleased songs. The original mix of the album was re-released for Record Store Day in 2014 through Beer City Records.

Kurt Cobain listed it in his top 50 albums of all time.

Track listing

Personnel
 Dave Dictor – lead vocals
 Ron Posner – guitar, backing vocals
 Franco Mares – bass
 Al Schvitz – drums

Additional performers
 Buxf Dicks; Tammy Cleveland; J.J. – backing vocals

Production
 Geza X – producer
 Erik Wolf – engineer
 East Bay Ray – mixing
 Dan Yaney – mastering
 Carlos Lowry – front cover art
 Buxf Dicks – back cover art

References

MDC (band) albums
1982 debut albums
Albums produced by Geza X